N-Acetylserotonin O-methyltransferase, also known as ASMT, is an enzyme which catalyzes the final reaction in melatonin biosynthesis: converting Normelatonin to melatonin. This reaction is embedded in the more general tryptophan metabolism pathway.  The enzyme also catalyzes a second reaction in tryptophan metabolism: the conversion of 5-hydroxy-indoleacetate to 5-methoxy-indoleacetate.  The other enzyme which catalyzes this reaction is n-acetylserotonin-o-methyltransferase-like-protein. 

In humans the ASMT enzyme is encoded by the pseudoautosomal ASMT gene. A copy exists near the endcaps of the short arms of both the X chromosome and the Y chromosome.

Structure and gene location
N-Acetylserotonin O-methyltransferase is an enzyme that is coded for by genes located on the pseudoautosomal region of the X and Y chromosome, and is most abundantly found in the pineal gland and retina of humans.
The structure of N- Acetylserotonin O-methyltransferase has been determined by X-ray diffraction.

Class of enzyme and function
N-Acetylserotonin O-methyltransferase can be classified under three types of enzyme functional groups: transferases, one-carbon group transferrers, and methyltransferases.

It catalyzes two reactions in the tryptophan metabolism pathway, and both can be traced back to serotonin.  Serotonin has many fates in this pathway, and N- Acetylserotonin O-methyltransferase catalyzes reactions in two of these fates.  The enzyme has been studied most for its catalysis of the final step of the pathway from serotonin to melatonin, but it also catalyzes one of the reactions in the many step process of serotonin → 5-Methoxy-indolacetate.

Synonyms
Synonyms of N- Acetylserotonin O-methyltransferase are Hydroxyindole O-methyltransferase (HIOMT), Acetylserotonin O-methyltransferase (ASMT), Acetylserotonin N-methyltransferase, Acetylserotonin methyltransferase (Y chromosome).  The most commonly used synonym is Hydroxyindole O-methyltransferase (HIOMT).

Organisms
N- Acetylserotonin O-methyltransferase is found in both prokaryotes and eukaryotes.  It is found in the bacteria Rhodopirellula baltica and Chromobacterium violaceum. It is also found in the following eukaryotes: Gallus gallus (chicken), Bos taurus (cow), Homo sapiens (human), Macaca mulatta (rhesus monkey), and Rattus norvegicus (rat).

Amino acid sequences
Bos taurus (cattle) has 350 amino acids and the amino acid sequence is:

MCSQEGEGYSLLKEYANAFMVSQVLFAACELGVFELLAEALEPLDSAAVSSHLGSSPGD
RAATEHLCVPEAAASRREGRKSCVCKHGARQHLPGERQPQVPAGHAAVRGQDRLRLLAP
PGEAVREGRNQYLKAFGIPSEELFSAIYRSEDERLQFMQGLQDVWRLEGATVLAAFDLS
PFPLICDLGGGSGALAKACVSLYPGCRAIVFDIPGVVQIAKRHFSASEDERISFHEGDF
FKDALPEADLYILARVLHDWTDAKCSHLLQRVYRACRTGGGILVIESLLDTDGRGPLTT
LLYSLNMLVQTEGRERTPGRSTARSVGPAASETCGDGGRGEPTMLSWPGNQACSV

For Homo sapiens (human) with 373 amino acids the sequence is:

MGSSEDQAYRLLNDYANGFMVSQVLFAACELGVFDLLAEAPGPLDVAAVAAGVRASAHG
TELLLDICVSLKLLKVETRGGKAFYRNTELSSDYLTTVSPTSQCSMLKYMGRTSYRCWG
HLADAVREGRNQYLETFGVPAEELFTAIYRSEGERLQFMQALQEVWSVNGRSVLTAFDL
SVFPLMCDLGGTRIKLETIILSKLSQGQKTKHRVFSLIGGAGALAKECMSLYPGCKITV
FDIPEVVWTAKQHFSFQEEEQIDFQEGDFFKDPLPEADLYILARVLHDWADGKCSHLLE
RIYHTCKPGGGILVIESLLDEDRRGPLLTQLYSLNMLVQTEGQERTPTHYHMLLSSAGF
RDFQFKKTGAIYDAILARK

Alternative splicing
The human HOIMT gene is approximately 35 kb in length and contains 9-10 exons.  The gene can be alternatively spliced to form at least three possible isoforms, although each of these isoforms has the same role in the biosynthesis of melatonin.  It has also been found that the gene contains multiple promoter regions, an indication that multiple mechanisms of regulation exist.

Expression in immune cells 
Recent studies found messenger RNA (mRNA) transcripts of the HOIMT gene in B lymphocytes, T helper lymphocytes, cytoxic T lymphocytes, and natural killer lymphocytes in humans.  This finding, in conjunction with research on alternative splicing of the HOIMT hnRNA, suggests that Hydroxyindole O-methyltransferase (synonym for N- Acetylserotonin O-methyltransferase) plays a role in the human immune system, in addition to its endocrine and nervous system functions.  In other words, the gene may be expressed in various isoforms in different cells of the body.

Reactions catalyzed 
In the tryptophan metabolism pathway, N- Acetylserotonin O-methyltransferase catalyzes two separate reactions.
The first reaction shown (Figure 2) is the reaction of N-acetyl-serotonin to N-acetyl-5-methoxy-tryptamine.  S-adenosyl-L-methionine is used as a substrate and is converted to S-adenosyl-L-homocysteine.
Figure 2: Reaction catalyzed by N- Acetylserotonin O-methyltransferase

Figure 3 is the same reaction as above, but the figure provides a clearer picture of how the reactant proceeds to product using N-Acetylserotonin O-methyltransferase in addition to the substrate.

Figure 3: Role of N- Acetylserotonin O-methyltransferase

The second reaction (Figure 4) catalyzed by N-Acetylserotonin O-methyltransferase in the tryptophan metabolism pathway is: S-Adenosyl-L-methionine + 5-Hydroxyindoleacetate ↔ S-Adenosyl-L-homocysteine + 5-Methoxyindoleacetate.

Figure 4: Second reaction catalyzed by N- Acetylserotonin O-methyltransferase

Figure 5 is a more general scheme of the reaction pathway from serotonin to melatonin.  The number 2.1.1.4 refers to the Enzyme Commission Number (EC Number) for N- Acetylserotonin O-methyltransferase.  These two steps are embedded in the highly involved tryptophan metabolism pathway.

Figure 5: Pathway serotonin → melatonin

Clinical implications

Tumors
There is evidence of high HIOMT gene expression in pineal parenchymal tumors (PPTs).  This finding has led to the study of varying gene expression as a diagnostic marker for such tumors.  Abnormally high levels of HIOMT in these glands could serve as an indication of the existence of PPTs in the brain.

Psychiatric disorders
Melatonin levels are used as a trait marker for mood disorders, meaning that abnormal levels of melatonin can be used in conjunction with other diagnostic criteria to determine whether a mood disorder (e.g. Seasonal affective disorder, bipolar disorder, or major depressive disorder) exists.  Melatonin levels can also be used as a state marker, contributing to conclusions on the severity of a patient's illness at a given point in time.  Because studies have shown a direct correlation between the amount of hydroxyindole-O-methyltransferase in the pineal gland and the melatonin level, additional knowledge of HIOMT could provide valuable insight on the nature and onset of these impairing disorders.

Developmental disorders

Subjects with autism were found to have significantly lower levels of melatonin and acetylserotonin O-methyltransferase (ASMT) than controls.

Linkage analysis
High frequency polymorphism exists on the PAR region of the sex chromosomes, where the HIOMT gene is located.  Linkage analysis of a diseased locus with high frequency polymorphism of this region could lead to vital information about the role of this gene in genetic disorders.

Additional research 
HIOMT as the limiting reagent in the melatonin biosynthetic pathway

There has been some controversy over the regulatory power of hydroxyindole-O-methyltransferase in the production of melatonin.  In 2001, it was argued that another enzyme in the pathway, N-acetyl transferase (NAT) was the limiting reagent in the production of melatonin.  Recent findings, however, have suggested that HIOMT, not NAT, is the limiting reagent, and a direct correlation between HIOMT expression and melatonin levels has been shown to exist.

See also
 Methyltransferase

References

Further reading

External links 
 
 
 

Transferases
Biology of bipolar disorder